Roger David Edward Nichols (born 6 April 1939) is an English musicologist, critic, translator and author. After an early career as a university lecturer he became a full-time freelance writer in 1980. He is particularly known for his works on French music, including books about Claude Debussy, Olivier Messiaen, Maurice Ravel, Francis Poulenc and the Parisian musical scene of the years after the First World War. Among his translations are the English versions of the standard biography of Gabriel Fauré by Jean-Michel Nectoux and of Harry Halbreich's study of Arthur Honegger.

Life and career
Nichols was born in the English city of Ely, Cambridgeshire, the son of Edward Nichols and his wife Dorothy, née West, who were respectively a lawyer and an accountant. He was educated at Harrow, where he read classics, and Worcester College, Oxford, where he studied under Edmund Rubbra. In 1964, he married Sarah Edwards, a teacher; they have two sons and a daughter. After graduating he became a schoolmaster at St Michael's College, Tenbury (1966–1973), after which he was a lecturer for the Open University (1975–1976) and the University of Birmingham (1978–1980). In 1982 he studied piano in Paris with Magda Tagliaferro.

After research into the songs of Claude Debussy, Nichols's first book, published by the Oxford University Press (OUP) was a study of that composer (1972), an 86-page work, part of the OUP's "Oxford Studies of Composers" series. Later books include studies of Messiaen (1974) and Ravel (1977), and as editor or translator or both, collections of letters and reminiscences by and about Debussy (1987), Ravel (1987 and 2011), Berlioz (1995), Satie (1995) and Mendelssohn (1997). Among his most substantial translations are the English versions of Jean-Michel Nectoux's Gabriel Fauré: les voix du clair-obscur (1990), published by the Cambridge University Press as Gabriel Fauré: A Musical Life (1991), and Harry Halbreich's Arthur Honegger (1992), published by the Amadeus Press under the same title (1999).

In 2002 Nichols produced The Harlequin Years: Music in Paris 1917–1929. The Musical Times said of it, "The Harlequin Years is a marvellous book, and it deserves to be read by the widest possible audience. ... A classic." This volume grew out of a 12-part series of the same name for BBC Radio 3. From 1980 to 1992 Nichols also presented the Radio 3 drive time programme Mainly for Pleasure, now called In Tune. Among his other broadcasts on Radio 3 was a five-part series on the life and art of Emmanuel Chabrier, with Clive Swift speaking the composer's words.

For the 1980 Grove Dictionary of Music and Musicians, Nichols wrote the articles on Debussy and Poulenc. He has contributed regularly to The Musical Times and the BBC Music Magazine.

In 2006 the French government appointed Nichols a Chevalier of the Legion of Honour for his forty years of service to French music.

Works

Books by Nichols

Translations

Editions
 Left unfinished after Burton's death.

Contributions to symposia
 "La sexualité de Maurice Ravel", in Cahiers Maurice Ravel no 16, 2013–2014
 "Ravel and the twentieth century", in The Cambridge Companion to Ravel, edited by Deborah Mawer, Cambridge, 2000
 "The reception of Debussy's music in Britain up to 1914", in Debussy Studies, edited by Richard Langham Smith, Cambridge University Press, 1997
 "Claude Debussy", "Francis Poulenc", in The New Grove Twentieth-Century Masters, Macmillan, 1980

BBC Radio 3 documentaries
 "A Flower in the Jungle" (Maggie Teyte) 1988
 "A Winning Hand" (Benno Moiseiwitsch) 1990
 "Arthur Honegger, a portrait" 1992

Music scores edited
For Edition Peters, London:
 The Art of French Song, 2 vols, each both high and medium low, ISMN: 9790577081618

Notes, references and sources

Notes

References

Sources

 

1939 births
British musicologists
English music critics
Living people
Opera critics
Debussy scholars
Ravel scholars
Messiaen scholars